The Co-Cathedral of St. Joseph Also Tadó Cathedral is a cathedral of the Catholic Church under the invocation of St. Joseph. The building is located in the municipality of Tadó in the department of Chocó in the South American country of Colombia and is one of the episcopal headquarters of the Diocese of Istmina-Tadó along with the St. Paul Cathedral in Istmina.

The building was originally designed as a parish church, being elevated to the rank of co-cathedral on April 30, 1990, by Pope John Paul II,  when the mentioned diocese is created, later, for its historical significance, architectural and cultural value was declared a Monument National by resolution No.0795 of July 31, 1998. In addition, the cathedral building underwent a total restoration between 1999 and 2006.

See also
Roman Catholicism in Colombia
Co-Cathedral
List of cathedrals in Colombia

References

Roman Catholic cathedrals in Colombia
Roman Catholic churches completed in 1918
20th-century Roman Catholic church buildings in Colombia